Martina Cavallero (born 7 May 1990) is an Argentine field hockey player. At the 2012 Summer Olympics, she competed for the Argentina national team where the team achieved the silver medal. Martina also won three Champions Trophy, the World League 2014-15, the bronze medal at the 2014 World Cup and two Pan American Cups.  She was also part of the 2016 Olympic team.

References

External links 
 

1990 births
Living people
Argentine female field hockey players
Olympic field hockey players of Argentina
Field hockey players at the 2012 Summer Olympics
Olympic medalists in field hockey
Las Leonas players
Olympic silver medalists for Argentina
Argentine people of Italian descent
Medalists at the 2012 Summer Olympics
Field hockey players at the 2015 Pan American Games
Pan American Games silver medalists for Argentina
Field hockey players at the 2016 Summer Olympics
Pan American Games medalists in field hockey
South American Games gold medalists for Argentina
South American Games medalists in field hockey
Female field hockey forwards
Expatriate field hockey players
Argentine expatriate sportspeople in Germany
Competitors at the 2014 South American Games
Mannheimer HC players
Feldhockey Bundesliga (Women's field hockey) players
Sportspeople from Buenos Aires Province
Medalists at the 2015 Pan American Games
20th-century Argentine women
21st-century Argentine women